James Anthony "Tony" Gaffney, CBE, FICE, FREng, FCIHT (1928–2016) was a British civil engineer.

Gaffney was born in the Rhymney Valley, South Wales in 1928 and holds BSc and DSc degrees.

He was the County Engineer for the West Riding of Yorkshire at the time of the construction of Scammonden Reservoir and M62 in the late 1960s. He was elected president of the Chartered Institution of Highways and Transportation for the 1978-79 session and elected president of the Institution of Civil Engineers for the 1983-84 session. 

As part of the 1984 Queen's Birthday Honours Gaffney was, on 16 June, appointed a Commander of the Order of the British Empire, in the civil division. At one point he was Director of Engineering Services at the West Yorkshire Metropolitan County Council.

He died on 2 March 2016 at the age of 87.

References

Bibliography 

        
        
        
        
        
        

1928 births
2016 deaths
Welsh civil engineers
Presidents of the Institution of Civil Engineers
Presidents of the Smeatonian Society of Civil Engineers
Date of birth missing
Welsh people of Irish descent
People from Monmouthshire
Commanders of the Order of the British Empire
Fellows of the Royal Academy of Engineering